Kayrakkeşli (also called Kayrakkeşlik) is a village in Mersin Province, Turkey. It's part of Toroslar district (which is an intracity district within Mersin city). The population of the village  was 181  as of 2012.

References

External links
For images

Villages in Toroslar District